Moshe Zar (born 1938) is a religious Zionist, a former member of the terrorist organization "Jewish Underground", and Israeli settler leader in the northern West Bank. He has been buying land from individual Palestinians since 1979. 

Zar is a long-time friend of former Israeli Prime Minister Ariel Sharon from their service in Unit 101. He was wounded in the 1956 Sinai Campaign, and lost his left eye as a result of his injuries. In 1983, he was attacked and stabbed by a group of Palestinians, but survived.

In 1984, he was convicted of membership in the terrorist organization the "Jewish Underground" of the early 1980s, and sentenced to three years in prison for his part in the assassination of Palestinian mayors, but only spent a few months in jail. His wife Yael is quoted by the Israeli newspaper Haaretz as having said at the time: "The underground is not a stage in the life of the Zar family, but a stage in the life of the nation."

After one of his eight children, his son Gilad, a security officer of the Shomron Regional Council, was killed in an ambush on May 29, 2001, he vowed that he would establish six settlements in his son's memory, one for each Hebrew letter of his name. The settlement outpost Ramat Gilad was established in 2001, the outpost Havat Gilad was established in 2002 and has been dismantled by the Israeli military forces several times, leading to violent clashes between settlers and security forces.

References

1938 births
Living people
Israeli settlers
Israeli Jews
People from Jerusalem
Israeli military personnel
Jewish religious terrorism
People convicted on terrorism charges
Failed assassins